Yee Sar Da Mya is a 1967 Burmese black-and-white drama film, directed by Maung Maung Soe and Maung Maung Myint starring Win Oo and Khin Than Nu.

Cast
Win Oo as Bo Son Nyo
Khin Than Nu as Khin Phone Myint
Kyaw Than
Win Swe
Jolly Swe
Khin Ohn Myint

References

1967 films
1960s Burmese-language films
Burmese drama films
Films shot in Myanmar
1967 drama films